Beast of Burden is a 2018 American crime action film directed by Jesper Ganslandt and written by Adam Hoelzel. It stars Daniel Radcliffe, Grace Gummer, Robert Wisdom, and Pablo Schreiber, and follows an ex-Air Force pilot who must deliver cocaine across the Mexico–United States border for his final run as a drug smuggler.

The film was simultaneously released in limited theaters and on VOD in the United States on February 23, 2018, by Momentum Pictures.

Plot
Sean Haggerty (Daniel Radcliffe) is a pilot who transports cocaine across the United States border. Over the course of his final day on the job, he must successfully navigate both the Drug Enforcement Administration and the Cartel, while simultaneously salvaging his fraught marriage.

Cast
Daniel Radcliffe as Sean
Grace Gummer as Jen
Pablo Schreiber as Bloom
Robert Wisdom as Mallory
David Joseph Martinez as Octavio Hernandez
Renée Willett as Megan
Mark Smith as Federale

Production
The film had a limited theatrical release on February 23, 2018.

Reception

References

External links
 
 
 

2018 crime action films
2018 films
American crime action films
American aviation films
Films shot in Georgia (U.S. state)
2010s English-language films
2010s American films